The Next West Bengal Legislative Assembly election is speculated to be held on or before March-April 2026 to elect all 294 members of the state's Legislative Assembly.

Background 
In the previous assembly elections, The AITC-GJM coalition won 214 seats out of 292 seats, with 2 seats being vacant. After the victory, Mamata Banerjee became the next chief minister of the state. 5 MLA, with Mukul Roy, joined the AITC from the BJP. After Mamata Banerjee lost from Nandigram, later she won the by-election from Bhabanipur.

Schedule

Parties and alliances







Notes

References

2026
West Bengal